Tuulispää was a Finnish language satirical magazine which existed between 1903 and 1957. It was the media outlet of conservative nationalism in Finland. However, the magazine described itself as a representative of genuine satire and humor without any party affiliation.

History and profile
Tuulispää was started in 1903 as a successor of Matti Meikäläinen, another satirical magazine which was closed by Governor General Bobrikov in Summer 1899. Although the magazine claimed that it had a political stance, it also declared that it had no political party affiliation. Tuulispää was close to the Finnish-speaking Fennoman groups consisting of small landowners and independent farmers. This group was one of the active factions involving in the discussions about the Finnishness, Finnish culture and Finnish identity. The magazine adopted a conservative nationalist political stance criticising the Finnish labour movement and the Swedish-speaking elite in the country. It also attempted to create a balance between the National Coalition Party and the National Progressive Party. Some of the contributors included Topi Vikstedt, Oscar Furuhjelm and Eric Vasström.

Tuulispää used the Old Helsinki slang during the initial period of its publication. In the 1920s and 1930s the magazine had a steady circulation selling 3,000-4,000 copies. The magazine folded in 1957.

References

External links

1903 establishments in Finland
1957 disestablishments in Finland
Conservatism in Finland
Conservative magazines
Cultural magazines
Defunct political magazines published in Finland
Finnish-language magazines
Finnish nationalism
Finnish political satire
Magazines established in 1903
Magazines disestablished in 1957
Magazines published in Helsinki
Satirical magazines